Pica is the eating or craving of things that are not food. It can be a disorder in itself or medical phenomena. The ingested or craved substance may be biological, natural or manmade. The term was drawn directly from the medieval Latin word for magpie, a bird subject to much folklore regarding its opportunistic feeding behaviors.

According to the Diagnostic and Statistical Manual of Mental Disorders, 5th Edition (DSM-5), pica as a standalone eating disorder must persist for more than one month at an age when eating such objects is considered developmentally inappropriate, not part of culturally sanctioned practice, and sufficiently severe to warrant clinical attention. Pica may lead to intoxication in children, which can result in an impairment of both physical and mental development. In addition, it can cause surgical emergencies to address intestinal obstructions, as well as more subtle symptoms such as nutritional deficiencies and parasitosis. Pica has been linked to other mental disorders. Stressors such as psychological trauma, maternal deprivation, family issues, parental neglect, pregnancy, and a disorganized family structure are risk factors for pica.

Pica is most commonly seen in pregnant women, small children, and people who may have developmental disabilities such as autism. Children eating painted plaster containing lead may develop brain damage from lead poisoning. A similar risk exists from eating soil near roads that existed before the phase-out of tetraethyllead or that were sprayed with oil (to settle dust) contaminated by toxic PCBs or dioxin. In addition to poisoning, a much greater risk exists of gastrointestinal obstruction or tearing in the stomach. Another risk of eating soil is the ingestion of animal feces and accompanying parasites. Pica can also be found in animals such as dogs and cats.

Signs and symptoms

Pica is the consumption of substances with no significant nutritional value such as soap, drywall, or paint. Subtypes are characterized by the substance eaten:

This pattern of eating should last at least one month to meet the time diagnostic criterion of pica.

Complications
Complications may occur due to the substance consumed. For example, lead poisoning may result from the ingestion of paint or paint-soaked plaster, hairballs may cause intestinal obstruction and Toxoplasma or Toxocara infections may follow ingestion of feces or soil.

Causes
Pica is currently recognized as a mental disorder by the Diagnostic and Statistical Manual of Mental Disorders (DSM-5). According to the DSM-5, mineral deficiencies are occasionally associated with pica, but biological abnormalities are rarely found. People practicing forms of pica, such as geophagy, pagophagy, and amylophagy, are more likely to be anemic or to have low hemoglobin concentration in their blood, lower levels of red blood cells (hematocrit), or lower plasma zinc levels. Specifically, practicing geophagy is more likely to be associated with anemia or low hemoglobin. Practicing pagophagy and amylophagy is more highly associated with anemia. Additionally, children and pregnant women may be more likely to have anemia or low hemoglobin relative to the general population. Mental health conditions such as obsessive–compulsive disorder (OCD) and schizophrenia have been proposed as causes of pica. More recently, cases of pica have been tied to the obsessive–compulsive spectrum, and a move has arisen to consider OCD in the cause of pica. Sensory, physiological, cultural, and psychosocial perspectives have also been used to explain the causation of pica.

Pica may be a cultural practice not associated with a deficiency or disorder. Ingestion of kaolin (white clay) among African American women in the US state of Georgia shows the practice there to be a DSM-4 "culture-bound syndrome" and "not selectively associated with other psychopathology". Similar kaolin ingestion is also widespread in parts of Africa. Such practices may stem from health benefits such as the ability of clay to absorb plant toxins and protect against toxic alkaloids and tannic acids.

Diagnosis
No single test confirms pica, but because pica can occur in people who have lower than normal nutrient levels and poor nutrition (malnutrition), the health care provider should test blood levels of iron and zinc.
Hemoglobin can also be checked to test for anemia. Lead levels should always be checked in children who may have eaten paint or objects covered in lead-paint dust. The healthcare provider should test for infection if the patient has been eating contaminated soil or animal waste.

DSM-5
The DSM-5 posits four criteria that must be met for a person to be diagnosed with pica:

Person must have been eating non-nutritive nonfoods for at least one month.
This eating must be considered abnormal for the person's stage of development.
Eating these substances cannot be associated with a cultural practice that is considered normal in the social context of the individual.
For people who currently have a medical condition (e.g.: pregnancy) or a mental disorder (e.g.: autism spectrum), the action of eating non-nutritive nonfoods should only be considered pica if it is dangerous and requires extra medical investigation or treatment on top of what they are already receiving for their pre-existing condition.

Differential diagnosis
In individuals with autism, schizophrenia, and certain physical disorders (such as Kleine–Levin syndrome), non-nutritive substances may be eaten. In such instances, pica should not be noted as an additional diagnosis.

Treatment
Treatment for pica may vary by patient and suspected cause (e.g., child, developmentally disabled, pregnant, or psychogenic) and may emphasize psychosocial, environmental and family-guidance approaches; iron deficiency may be treatable through iron supplements or through dietary changes. An initial approach often involves screening for, and if necessary, treating any mineral deficiencies or other comorbid conditions. For pica that appears to be of psychogenic cause, therapy and medication such as SSRIs have been used successfully. However, previous reports have cautioned against the use of medication until all non-psychogenic causes have been ruled out.

Looking back at the different causes of pica related to assessment, the clinician tries to develop a treatment. First, there is pica as a result of social attention. A strategy might be used of ignoring the person's behavior or giving them the least possible attention. If their pica is a result of obtaining a favorite item, a strategy may be used where the person is able to receive the item or activity without eating inedible items. The individual's communication skills should increase so that they can relate what they want to another person without engaging in this behavior. If pica is a way for a person to escape an activity or situation, the reason why the person wants to escape the activity should be examined and the person should be moved to a new situation. If pica is motivated by sensory feedback, an alternative method of feeling that sensation should be provided. Other nonmedication techniques might include other ways for oral stimulation such as gum. Foods such as popcorn have also been found helpful. These things can be placed in a "pica box" that should be easily accessible to the individual when they feel like engaging in pica.

Behavior-based treatment options for pica can be useful for individuals who have a developmental disability or mental illness. Behavioral treatments have been shown to reduce pica severity by 80% in people with intellectual disabilities. These treatments may involve using positive reinforcement normal behavior. Many use aversion therapy, where the patient learns through positive reinforcement which foods are good and which ones they should not eat. Often, treatment is similar to the treatment of obsessive–compulsive or addictive disorders (such as exposure therapy). In some cases, treatment is as simple as addressing the fact they have this disorder and why they may have it. A recent study classified nine such classes of behavioral intervention: Success with treatment is generally high and generally fades with age, but it varies depending on the cause of the disorder. Developmental causes tend to have a lower success rate.

Treatment techniques include:

Epidemiology
The prevalence of pica is difficult to establish because of differences in definition and the reluctance of patients to admit to abnormal cravings and ingestion, thus leading to the prevalence recordings of pica among at-risk groups being in the range of 8% to 65% depending on the study. Based on compiled self-report and interview data of pregnant and postpartum women, pica is most prevalent geographically in Africa, with an estimated prevalence of 44.8%, followed by North and South America (23.0%) and Eurasia (17.5%). Factors associated with Pica in this population were determined to be anemia and low levels of education, both of which are associated with low socioeconomic backgrounds. Two studies of adults with intellectual disabilities living in institutions found that 21.8% and 25.8% of these groups had pica.

Prevalence rates for children are unknown. Young children commonly place non-nutritious material into their mouths. This activity occurs in 75% of 12-month-old infants, and 15% of two- to three-year-old children.

In institutionalized children with mental disabilities, pica occurs in 10–33%.

History
The condition currently known as pica was first described by Hippocrates.

The term pica originates in the Latin word for magpie, pīca, a bird famed for its unusual eating behaviors and believed to eat almost anything. The Latin may have been a translation of a Greek word meaning both 'magpie, jay' and 'pregnancy craving, craving for strange food'. In 13th-century Latin work, pica was referenced by the Greeks and Romans; however, it was not addressed in medical texts until 1563.

In the southern United States in the 1800s, geophagia was a common practice among the slave population. Geophagia is a form of pica in which the person consumes earthly substances such as clay, and is particularly prevalent to augment a mineral-deficient diet. Noteworthy is the fact that kaolin was consumed by West Africans enslaved in the Southeastern United States, particularly the Georgia belt, due to the antidiarrheal qualities in the treatment of dysentery and other abdominal ailments. The practice of consuming kaolin rocks was thereafter studied scientifically, the results of which led to the subsequent pharmaceutical commercialization of kaolinite, the clay mineral contained in kaolin. Kaolinite became the active ingredient in drugs such as Kaopectate and Pepto-Bismol, although the formulations have since found additional active ingredients to replace kaolinite.

Research on eating disorders from the 16th to the 20th centuries suggests that during that time in history, pica was regarded more as a symptom of other disorders rather than its own specific disorder. Even today, what could be classified as pica behavior is a normative practice in some cultures as part of their beliefs, healing methods, or religious ceremonies.

Prior to the elimination of the category of "feeding disorders in infancy and early childhood", which is where pica was classified, from the DSM-5, pica was primarily diagnosed in children. However, since the removal of the category, psychiatrists have started to diagnose pica in people of all ages.

Animals
Unlike in humans, pica in dogs or cats may be a sign of immune-mediated hemolytic anemia, especially when it involves eating substances such as tile grout, concrete dust, and sand. Dogs exhibiting this form of pica should be tested for anemia with a complete blood count or at least hematocrit levels. Although several hypotheses have been proposed by experts to explain pica in animals, insufficient evidence exists to prove or disprove any of them.

See also 
 Michel Lotito, Frenchman known for his ability to eat and digest metal, nicknamed Monsieur Mangetout ('Mr. Eat-All')
 Animal psychopathology#Pica
 Swallow, a 2019 film about a young woman who, emotionally stifled in her marriage and domestic life, develops an impulse to consume inedible objects.

References

Further reading

External links

 
Mental disorders diagnosed in childhood
Eating behaviors
Eating disorders
Dog diseases